The Town of Westport is located in Dane County, Wisconsin, United States and a suburb of Madison. The population was 4,183 at the 2020 census. The town was named after Westport, County Mayo in Ireland because many of the early settlers were from there. The village of Waunakee was carved out of the town in 1893, leaving the remainder of the town on both sides. Other portions have been annexed by the cities of Madison and Middleton.

Geography
According to the United States Census Bureau, the town has a total area of 27.2 square miles (70.6 km), of which, 22.2 square miles (57.6 km) of it is land and 5.0 square miles (13.0 km) of it (18.39%) is water.

Governor Nelson State Park is located in the town.

Demographics
At the 2000 census there were 3,586 people, 1,546 households, and 1,049 families living in the town. The population density was 161.3 people per square mile (62.3/km). There were 1,752 housing units at an average density of 78.8 per square mile (30.4/km).  The racial makeup of the town was 97.69% White, 0.61% African American, 0.17% Native American, 0.86% Asian, 0.08% Pacific Islander, 0.25% from other races, and 0.33% from two or more races. Hispanic or Latino of any race were 0.78%.

Of the 1,546 households 25.3% had children under the age of 18 living with them, 62.4% were married couples living together, 3.5% had a female householder with no husband present, and 32.1% were non-families. 25.5% of households were one person and 7.6% were one person aged 65 or older. The average household size was 2.32 and the average family size was 2.80.

The age distribution was 20.8% under the age of 18, 4.7% from 18 to 24, 27.3% from 25 to 44, 32.2% from 45 to 64, and 15.0% 65 or older. The median age was 43 years. For every 100 females, there were 104.3 males. For every 100 females age 18 and over, there were 101.8 males.

The median household income was $64,750 and the median family income  was $75,357. Males had a median income of $51,671 versus $34,671 for females. The per capita income for the town was $40,268. About 0.7% of families and 3.0% of the population were below the poverty line, including none of those under age 18 and 3.5% of those age 65 or over.

Notable people

 Edward E. Fitzgibbon, Wisconsin State Representative, farmer, and teacher lived in the town; Fitzgibbon served as Westport Town Clerk
 John H. Tierney, Wisconsin State Representative and farmer, lived in the town; Tierney served as chairman of the Westport Town Board

References

External  links
Town of Westport, Wisconsin website

Towns in Dane County, Wisconsin
Madison, Wisconsin, metropolitan statistical area
Towns in Wisconsin